Licensing International, formally known as (LIMA), founded in 1985, is the industry trade group of the $80 billion licensing industry. With over 1,000 member companies representing everything from major movie and TV studios and mega corporate brands down to individual artists, LIMA pioneered the annual Licensing Show in New York City and conducts seminars at the show in all aspects of licensing. Originally twelve members, it now has offices in New York, London, Munich, Tokyo and Shanghai.

See also
 Dan MacKenzie, director of the Canadian LIMA

References

Licensing organizations
Marketing organizations
Trademarks